Joseph Lansdale (4 March 1894 – 1977) was an English professional footballer who played as a goalkeeper in the Football League for Millwall. In 1926, he set a Football League record with 10 consecutive clean sheets.

Personal life 
Lansdale served as a gunner in the Royal Garrison Artillery during the First World War.

Career statistics

References 

English Football League players
English footballers
British Army personnel of World War I
Association football goalkeepers
Place of death missing
Royal Garrison Artillery soldiers
1894 births
1977 deaths
Footballers from Bolton
Norwich City F.C. players
Southern Football League players
Millwall F.C. players
Accrington Stanley F.C. (1891) players
Folkestone F.C. players
Military personnel from Lancashire